Waisea Nacuqu (born 24 May 1993) is a Fiji national rugby sevens team player. Nacuqu is known as "game breaker" and has on many occasions scored match winning tries. He is well known for his speed and scoring tries.

Early life and education 
Nacuqu is from Votua village near the township of Ba near the bank of Ba River. He refused to go back to school after Class 7 at Votua Catholic School and played Soccer for Tavua and rugby for the Westfield Tokatoka Barbarians in Nadi. He also scored the winning try in the 2014 Tokyo sevens final against South Africa.

Nacuqu is a cousin for Former Fiji 7's player Pio Tuwai and current Flying Fijian, Josua Tuisova. He was part of the Fiji sevens team that won a silver medal at the 2022 Commonwealth Games. He later won a gold medal at the 2022 Rugby World Cup Sevens in Cape Town.

Awards and honours 
 Player of the final 2018 Singapore Sevens.

References

External links

 

1993 births
Living people
Fijian Roman Catholics
Fijian rugby sevens players
People from Yasawa
Rugby sevens players at the 2020 Summer Olympics
Medalists at the 2020 Summer Olympics
Olympic gold medalists for Fiji
Olympic medalists in rugby sevens
Olympic rugby sevens players of Fiji
Rugby sevens players at the 2022 Commonwealth Games
Commonwealth Games silver medallists for Fiji
Commonwealth Games medallists in rugby sevens
Medallists at the 2022 Commonwealth Games